We Ride: The Story of Snowboarding is a feature-length documentary produced by Paz Parasmand and filmed and edited by creative production company Grain Media.

The film traces snowboarding’s routes back to the very beginning of the sport, starting in 1965 with Sherman Poppen's home-made invention for children, chronicling its boom in the 1990s up to its present mainstream status as a global cultural phenomenon. We Ride features interviews with some of the sport's most influential figures, including Todd Richards, Jake Burton Carpenter, Tom Sims, Craig Kelly, and burn-sponsored snowboarders Ståle Sandbech and Gigi Rüf. It was narrated by actor, comedian and pro-skater Jason Lee (actor) and directed by Grain Media founders Jon Drever and Orlando von Einsiedel, who had been a pro-snowboarder before turning his hand to film.

The film premiered at the opening of the annual snowboarding contest Air & Style in Innsbruck on 31 January 2013, and made its online premiere on 24 February 2013.

References

2013 films
British documentary films
2010s English-language films
2010s British films